Niagara was an electoral district of the Legislative Assembly of the Parliament of the Province of Canada, in Canada West (now Ontario). It was created in 1841, upon the establishment of the Province of Canada by the union of Upper Canada and Lower Canada. Niagara was represented by one member in the Legislative Assembly.  It was abolished in 1867, upon the creation of Canada and the province of Ontario.

Boundaries 

Niagara electoral district was based largely on the municipal boundaries of the town of Niagara, located at the mouth of the Niagara River where it flows into Lake Ontario. Niagara was the major centre of the electoral district.

The Union Act, 1840 had merged the two provinces of Upper Canada and Lower Canada into the Province of Canada, with a single Parliament.  The separate parliaments of Lower Canada and Upper Canada were abolished.Union Act, 1840, 3 & 4 Vict. (UK), c. 35, s. 2.  The Union Act provided that the town of Niagara would constitute one electoral district in the Legislative Assembly of the new Parliament, but gave the Governor General of the Province of Canada the power to draw the boundaries for the electoral district.

The first Governor General, Lord Sydenham, issued a proclamation shortly after the formation of the Province of Canada in early 1841, establishing the boundaries for the electoral district:

Members of the Legislative Assembly 

Niagara was represented by one member in the Legislative Assembly. The following were the members for Niagara.

Notes

Abolition 

Niagara electoral district was abolished on July 1, 1867, when the British North America Act, 1867 came into force, creating Canada and splitting the Province of Canada into Quebec and Ontario.  It was succeeded by the electoral districts of Niagara in both the House of Commons of Canada and the Legislative Assembly of Ontario.

References 

Electoral districts of Canada West